Andrew Parker may refer to:

 Andrew Parker (politician) (1805–1864), U.S. Representative from Pennsylvania, 1851–1853
 Andrew Parker (zoologist) (born 1967), Australian zoologist
 Andrew Parker (athlete) (born 1965), Jamaican Olympic hurdler
 Andrew Parker, Baron Parker of Minsmere, British counter-espionage officer

See also
 Andrew Parker Bowles (born 1939), retired English military officer, first husband of the Duchess of Cornwall
 Andy Parker (disambiguation)